The Croatian Chess Federation (HŠS) is a chess governing body in Croatia. It is based in Zagreb. The federation was formed on 12 May 1912, and was accepted into FIDE, the World Chess Federation, in 1992.

The HŠS has 200 member clubs across the country. It also organizes:

Croatian Chess Championship
Croatian Women's Chess Championship
Croatian Junior Chess Championship
Croatian Cadet Chess Championship
Croatian Team Chess Championship
Croatian Cup

References

External links
 

National members of the European Chess Union
Chess in Croatia
Chess
1912 establishments in Croatia
Sports organizations established in 1912
Chess organizations
1912 in chess